Kemar Christopher "Ding Dong" Dwaine Ottey (born September 29, 1980) is a dancehall reggae artist and dancer. He was a dancer before becoming a Jamaican deejay (artiste) and dancehall reggae recording artist. His most notable songs "Bad Man Forward / Bad Man Pull Up" (2005) "Fling" and "Genna Bounce" released in 2017 has assisted in his global appeal.  He founded the dancing syndicate Ravers Clavers.

Personal life 

Born at Jubilee Hospital in Kingston, Jamaica, to Denise Bennett and Ferdinand Ottey, Ding Dong grew up in the community of  Nannyville, Jamaica, where he was raised by his grandmother and aunt after being taken by his father from his mother in Fletchers Land, Jamaica. The name "Ding Dong" was given to him by his father and he was also affectionately known as "Alla Ding".

Ding Dong was 3 years old when his father died, and he assisted his family as much as he could to make ends meet, including selling empty alcohol bottles left over at local dances. His hustling would become the foundation on which he built his future. Ding Dong has two sons.

Dancing career 
Dancing and football were Ding Dong's passions until the demands of each forced him to choose between them.

In early 2000 he joined the Flatbush Dance crew and spent many days and nights performing for community members and onlookers alike. Dancing soon consumed his life and in 2002, Ding Dong decided to commit his all in this art form, putting football on the back burner.

It was an event called Early Monday in the community of Standpipe where Ding met selector Tony Matterhorn who upon seeing his talent promised to take three days to make him known. Undeniably Ding became a popular household name in the world of Dancing and has since been the creator of numerous dances including Swing Song, Badman Fawad, Part Di Crowd, Chakka Chakka, Flowers a Bloom, Monument, Oh My Swing, ‘Paranoid, and Dip again. Ding also became a main staple in the lyrics of dancing songs over the years. The legendary Gerald “Bogle” Levy even gave Ding Dong the nod after seeing his skills in various dancehall events.

In early 2003, Ding Dong created the dance group Ravers Clavers with a group of friends. Members have come and gone along the way, but the number remains about 12-13 members. "We have other members that deal with the IT and promotional aspect of business, which put our team up to 16 members," he told Flair. The crew, all inhabitants of the Nannyville community are all talented in their own and have been instrumental in create popular dances known today, including 'Sivva', 'Shampoo', 'Lebeh Lebeh', 'Lowe Mi', ‘Fling’ and ‘Flairy’.

Ding Dong claims, "I think I have brought it (dancing) to the forefront again, not just in Jamaica, but across the entire Caribbean. People are dancing to dancehall again in schools, at weddings. Even the Prime Minister is dancing, and that is something I've always wanted to do as a dancer, get the Prime Minister dancing," he said

Music career 
He released his first single "Bad Man Forward Bad Man Pull Up" which was a chart topper  in late 2005 and early 2006. He was also known as "Mr BadMan Forward" because of the dance associated with the title of the record. Ding Dong is the host of It's all about Dance a dance-umentary directed by Jay Will.

Having dabbled in music as a recording artiste over the years; he was instrumental in the concept behind the single "Wakky Dip", an ode to the late Gerald “Bogle” Levy performed by Dancehall group Voicemail. Ding also made music with the late Danny Champagne and Elephant Man as well as winning several dancing titles.

2009 saw the release of “Holiday” a collaboration with Jamaican singer Chevaughn. Since its release, Ding Dong has continued recording. 'Hustler', 'Shampoo', 'Wul Up', 'Syvah', Produced by Ricky Blaze, 'Gas', 'Lowe Mi', 'Fling', 'Rock The Floor' alongside labelmate Dancehall Princess Shenseea, 'Flairy', 'Lebeh Lebeh', are a few of his hits. He has performed in the US, Europe and the Caribbean, and appeared in Rebel Salute 2018, the first Dancer turned Dancehall artiste ever billed for the show in its 24-year history. He recorded on the BigShip and Emudio labels. He currently calls Romeich Entertainment home and says 2018 and beyond will be even more historic.

Advertising work 
Grace Foods' brand campaign Flava with a Beat gave Ding Dong a major role as the voice behind the campaign jingle, and his latest dance move, flairy, became the official dance for the campaign. Other brands he has advertised include; Magnum Tonic Wine, GraceKennedy and Western Sports. "It is a blessing, especially for me representing the dancehall community and as a male from the garrison," Ding Dong said."It shows that it is not where you are from, but how you carry yourself," Ding Dong said.

Notable performances, interviews and concerts 

 Ding Dong on BBC 1Xtra with Seani B - Big Yard, Jamaica
 Ding Dong performs on BBC 1xtra with Sean B - Big Yard, Jamaica

References

Living people
Jamaican reggae musicians
1980 births